Carlo Zecchi (8 July 190331 August 1984) was an Italian pianist, music teacher and conductor.

Zecchi was born in Rome. A pupil of F. Baiardi for piano and of L. Refice and A. Bustini for composition, he began his career as a concert pianist at only seventeen years of age. He later studied piano with Ferruccio Busoni and Artur Schnabel in Berlin.  In 1938, he stopped playing the piano to study conducting with Hans Münch and Antonio Guarnieri. He led pianistic courses in Accademia Nazionale di Santa Cecilia, Rome, and in Salzburg. He was a highly acclaimed performer of the works of Domenico Scarlatti, Wolfgang Amadeus Mozart, Claude Debussy and of other Romantic music.  He died in Salzburg.

References

External links
 
 

1903 births
1984 deaths
Musicians from Rome
Italian male pianists
Italian male conductors (music)
Italian music educators
Piano pedagogues
Pupils of Artur Schnabel
Academic staff of the Accademia Nazionale di Santa Cecilia
20th-century Italian conductors (music)
20th-century classical pianists
20th-century Italian male musicians